Catastia actualis is a species of snout moth in the genus Catastia. It was described by George Duryea Hulst in 1886. It is found from Saskatchewan and Alberta to Colorado and north-eastern California to Lake Tahoe.

The length of the forewings is 12–14 mm. Adults are on wing from June to early July.

References

Moths described in 1886
Phycitini